Amar Khatik (also known as Amar Singh) is an Indian politician and a member of the Legislative Assembly of India. He represents the Kaimganj constituency of Uttar Pradesh and is a member of the Bhartiya Janata Party political party.

Early life and education 
Amar Singh Khatik was born in Farrukhabad district in Hindu Khateek family. He has completed Diploma in Mechanical Engineering.

Political career 
Amar Singh Khatik has been a MLA for one term. He represented the Kaimganj constituency and is a member of the Bhartiya Janata Party political party.

References

1945 births
Living people
Bharatiya Janata Party politicians from Uttar Pradesh
Uttar Pradesh politicians
Members of the Uttar Pradesh Legislative Assembly